Vladimir Lučić (born June 17, 1989) is a Serbian professional basketball player for Bayern Munich of the Basketball Bundesliga (BBL) and the EuroLeague. He also represents the Serbian national basketball team.

Professional career

Superfund
Lučić started playing basketball at senior level with the Serbian team Superfund in 2006, where he stayed until 2008.

Partizan
After two years at Superfund, Lučić was signed by Partizan before the start of the 2008–09 season. In his initial two years at Partizan, Lučić played very little under head coach Duško Vujošević. In 2010–11, under new head coach Vlada Jovanović, Lučić received more playing time, alternating between small forward and power forward throughout the season. He improved his statistics, nearly doubling them in the Euroleague, averaging 5.8 points and 2.4 rebounds. Before the start of 2012–13 season, he became the next team captain, shortly after longtime captain Petar Božić left the team over the summer. He led his team over 2012–13 Euroleague season with 13.7 points and 4.8 rebounds over 10 games, but eventually Partizan didn't proceed to the next round of the competition. With Partizan, he won five consecutive Serbian League championships, four straight ABA Leagues and Serbian Cups.

Valencia Basket
On June 24, 2013, Lučić signed a two-year contract with an option for a third year with Spanish club Valencia Basket. In his first season abroad, he had trouble with his back and left foot all over the season. He eventually had a foot surgery in January which sidelined him off the court until March. In his first EuroCup season, he averaged just 3.8 points and 2.3 rebounds over 8 games. Valencia eventually won the Eurocup, beating UNICS Kazan in the final.

On June 17, 2015, Valencia Basket extended the contract with him for one more season.

Bayern Munich
On July 26, 2016, Lučić signed a two-year contract with German club Bayern Munich. On June 9, 2017, Lučić signed a two-year contract extension with Bayern. He extended his contract until 2025 on February 8, 2022.

Serbian national team

Lučić won a gold medal with the Serbian university team at the 2011 Summer Universiade in Shenzhen. He made his debut with the senior Serbian national basketball team in the FIBA EuroBasket 2013 qualification. However, in a first game (against Iceland) he got injured and latter missed the rest of the qualification.

Lučić also represented Serbia at the EuroBasket 2017 where they won the silver medal, after losing in the final game to Slovenia. Over 9 tournament games, he averaged 8.9 points, 5.6 rebounds and 1.1 assists per game.

At the 2019 FIBA Basketball World Cup, the national team of Serbia was dubbed as favorite to win the trophy, but was eventually upset in the quarterfinals by Argentina. With wins over the United States and Czech Republic, it finished in fifth place. Lučić averaged 7.1 points and 3 rebounds over 8 games.

Personal life
His older brother Uroš Lučić is also a professional basketball player.

Career statistics

Euroleague

|-
| style="text-align:left;"| 2009–10
| style="text-align:left;" rowspan=4| Partizan
| 1 || 0 || 1.3 || .000 || .000 || .000 || .0 || .0 || .0 || .0 || .0 || -1.0
|-
| style="text-align:left;"| 2010–11
| 15 || 0 || 10.6 || .522 || .333 || .667 || 1.9 || .6 || .2 || .3 || 2.4 || 3.5
|-
| style="text-align:left;"| 2011–12
| 10 || 9 || 21.7 || .365 || .269 || .867 || 2.4 || 1.0 || .1 || .1 || 5.8 || 3.0
|-
| style="text-align:left;"| 2012–13
| 10 || 9 || 33.2 || .412 || .323 || .796 || 4.8 || .8 || 1.6 || .2 || 13.7 || 14.9
|-
| style="text-align:left;"| 2014–15
| style="text-align:left;"| Valencia
| 8 || 6 || 25.7 || .476 || .421 || .762 || 3.3 || .9 || .9 || .4 || 8.0 || 8.8
|-
| style="text-align:left;"| 2018–19
| style="text-align:left;" rowspan=4| Bayern
| 29 || 29 || 26.2 || .523 || .351 || .826 || 3.8 || 1.2 || 1.1 || .2 || 10.0 || 12.1
|-
| style="text-align:left;"| 2019–20
| 26 || 25 || 27.8 || .547 || .426 || .847 || 3.8 || 1.5 || 1.0 || .2 || 11.3 || 14.5
|-
| style="text-align:left;"| 2020–21
| 31 || 31 || 31.0 || .504 || .441 || .864 || 4.8 || 1.4 || 1.1 || .1 || 13.6 || 17.8
|-
| style="text-align:left;"| 2021–22
| 32 || 32 || 30.1 || .427 || .333 || .881 || 4.2 || 1.5 || .7 || .2 || 12.1 || 14.2
|- class="sortbottom"
| style="text-align:center;" colspan=2| Career
| 162 || 141 || 26.4 || .481 || .376 || .844 || 3.8 || 1.2 || .9 || .2 || 10.4 || 12.5

References

External links

Vladimir Lučić at acb.com 

Vladimir Lučić at euroleague.net
Vladimir Lučić at fiba.com

1989 births
Living people
ABA League players
Basketball League of Serbia players
Basketball players from Belgrade
FC Bayern Munich basketball players
KK Partizan players
KK Superfund players
Liga ACB players
Power forwards (basketball)
Serbian expatriate basketball people in Germany
Serbian expatriate basketball people in Spain
Serbian men's basketball players
Serbia men's national basketball team players
Small forwards
Universiade medalists in basketball
Valencia Basket players
Universiade gold medalists for Serbia
2019 FIBA Basketball World Cup players
Medalists at the 2011 Summer Universiade